Vladimir Nikolaevich Degtyarenko (born April 5, 1982) is a Ukrainian separatist and politician of the unrecognized Luhansk People's Republic. He was the second Chairman of the People's Council of the Lugansk People's Republic from April 1, 2016,  until December 21, 2017.

Early life 
Degtyarenko was born on April 5, 1982, in the city of Lutuhyne of the Luhansk Oblast. In 2004 he graduated from the DSMI with a degree in industrial and civil construction and later graduated from Donbas State Technical University with a degree in enterprise economics in 2011.

Career 
Since the start of the Russo-Ukrainian war, he was an active supporter of the Russian forces and the holding of a referendum in the Luhansk People's Republic (LPR).

On May 18, 2014, he was elected a deputy of the first convocation of the People's Council of the Luhansk People's Republic. During the entire period of hostilities in the summer of 2014, he was in Luhansk, engaged in parliamentary and humanitarian activities, and did not leave the city even disregarding the Russo-Ukrainian conflict.

In September 2014, he came from Luhansk to the city of Lutuhyne and became acting leader in Lutuhyne Raion and the city. In the same month, the deputies of the district officially appointed Degtyarenko as chairman of the Lutuhyne district council.

Since April 1, 2016 he was the Chairman of the People's Council of the Luhansk People's Republic and also approved by the Deputy Chairman of the Public Movement "Peace to Luhanshchina" for work with the People's Council of the LPR. He received 40 votes in his favor.

On December 21, 2017, he was unanimously, by 33 deputies present, dismissed from the post of chairman of the People's Council of the LPR because he had "improper organization of the work of the people's council".

References 

1982 births
People of the Luhansk People's Republic
Pro-Russian people of the 2014 pro-Russian unrest in Ukraine
Pro-Russian people of the war in Donbas
Living people
Ukrainian collaborators with Russia